The 2020–21 Karlsruher SC season was the club's 69th season in existence and the club's 2nd consecutive season in the second flight of German football. In addition to the domestic league, Karlsruher SC participated in this season's edition of the DFB-Pokal, being eliminated in the first round. The season covers the period from 1 July 2020 to 30 June 2021.

Players

First-team squad

Out on loan

Transfers

In

Out

Pre-season and friendlies

Competitions

Overview

2. Bundesliga

League table

Results summary

Results by round

Matches
The league fixtures were announced on 7 August 2020.

Matches

DFB-Pokal

Matches

Notes

References

External links

Karlsruher SC seasons
Karlsruher SC